Jaroslav Kvapil (25 September 1868 in Chudenice, Kingdom of Bohemia – 10 January 1950 in Prague) was a Czech poet, theatre director, translator, playwright, and librettist. From 1900 he was a director and Dramaturg at the National Theatre in Prague, where he introduced plays by Anton Chekhov, Henrik Ibsen and Maxim Gorky into the repertory. Later he was a director at the Vinohrady Theatre (1921–1928). He wrote six plays, but is today chiefly remembered as the librettist of Antonín Dvořák's Rusalka.

Kvapil was the principal author of the Manifesto of Czech writers of 1917, signed by over two hundred leading Czechs, favouring the concept of Czech self-government.

He was married to actress Hana Kvapilová from 1894 until her death in 1907.

References 

1868 births
1950 deaths
People from Klatovy District
People from the Kingdom of Bohemia
Czechoslovak National Democracy politicians
Members of the Revolutionary National Assembly of Czechoslovakia
20th-century Czech dramatists and playwrights
Czech male dramatists and playwrights
Czech Freemasons
Czech male poets
Czech opera librettists
Recipients of the Order of Tomáš Garrigue Masaryk
19th-century Czech dramatists and playwrights
20th-century Czech poets
20th-century male writers